Song Ah Sim (born ) is a Chinese table tennis player who competed in the 2000 Summer Olympics and 2004 Summer Olympics for Hong Kong.

References

1981 births
Living people
Table tennis players at the 2000 Summer Olympics
Table tennis players at the 2004 Summer Olympics
Olympic table tennis players of Hong Kong
Asian Games medalists in table tennis
Table tennis players at the 1998 Asian Games
Table tennis players at the 2002 Asian Games
Medalists at the 1998 Asian Games
Asian Games silver medalists for Hong Kong
Asian Games bronze medalists for Hong Kong
Table tennis players from Hebei